is a major highway on the island of Kyūshū in Japan. It connects the prefectural capital cities of Kagoshima (Kagoshima Prefecture), Kumamoto (Kumamoto Prefecture), and Fukuoka (Fukuoka Prefecture), passing through Kurume as well.

Its northern terminus is Moji-ku, Kitakyushu, where it meets National Route 2.

The total length of National Route 3 is 392.1 km.

Route data
Length: 392.1 km (243.7 mi)
Origin: Moji-ku, Kitakyūshū (originates at the terminus of Route 2)
Terminus: Kagoshima (ends at the terminus of Routes 10, 224, 225 and 226 and the origins of Route 58) 
Major cities: Kitakyūshū, Fukuoka, Kurume, Kumamoto, Kagoshima

History
4 December 1952 - First Class National Highway 3 (from Kitakyūshū to Kagoshima)
1 April 1965 - General National Highway 3 (from Kitakyushu to Kagoshima)

Overlapping sections
From Moji-ku, Kitakyushu (Oimatsu-Park intersection) to Kokurakita-ku, Kitakyūshū (Mihagino intersection): Route 10
From Kurume to Yamaga (Chuo Street intersection): Route 325
From Yamaga (Nishiue-machi intersection) to Yamaga (Chuo Street intersection): Route 443
From Kita-ku, Kumamoto (Ueki-machi Mouno intersection) to Chūō-ku, Kumamoto (Suido-cho intersection): Route 208
From Minami-ku, Kumamoto (Chikami-machi intersection) to Uto (Matsuwara intersection): Route 57
From Chūō-ku, Kumamoto (Suido-cho intersection) to Uki (Matsubase-machi Kugu): Route 218
From Chūō-ku, Kumamoto (Suido-cho intersection) to Yatsushiro (Hagiwara-machi intersection): Route 219
From Kagoshima Koyamada-chō (Koyamada-chō intersection) to Kagoshima Shiroyama-chō (Terukuni Shrine intersection): Route 328

Municipalities passed through
Fukuoka Prefecture
Kitakyūshū - Mizumaki - Onga - Okagaki - Munakata - Fukutsu - Koga - Shingu - Fukuoka - Onojō - Dazaifu - Chikushino - (via Saga Prefecture) - Kurume - Hirokawa - Yame
Saga Prefecture
Kiyama - Tosu
Kumamoto Prefecture
Yamaga - Kumamoto - Uto - Uki - Hikawa - Yatsushiro - Ashikita - Tsunagi - Minamata
Kagoshima Prefecture
Izumi - Akune - Satsumasendai - Ichikikushikino - Hioki - Kagoshima

References

003
Roads in Fukuoka Prefecture
Roads in Kagoshima Prefecture
Roads in Kumamoto Prefecture
Roads in Saga Prefecture